Barcice is a village in the administrative district of Gmina Ryjewo, within Kwidzyn County, Pomeranian Voivodeship, in northern Poland.

For the history of the region, see History of Pomerania.

The village has a population of 371.

References

Barcice